Nasrullah Khan was a Pakistani squash player. In 1966, he became coach to Ireland's Jonah Barrington, along with Azam Khan as Barrington's tactical advisor, helping Barrington to win his first of six British Open titles between 1967 and 1973. He also coached Angela Smith, the GB and England world star who became a legend herself in the ladies game ensuring that the sport was professional for women.

He is the brother of Roshan Khan, second cousin of Hashim Khan and Azam Khan and uncle of Jahangir Khan and Torsam Khan. His son Rehmat Khan is also a squash player, who married to Salma Agha. His granddaughter Natasha Khan (better known by the pseudonym "Bat For Lashes") is a singer and Sashaa Agha is an actress and singer.

References 

The Khan story. "The Khan story", August 2000, Accessed July 2007.
Jonah Barrington, "Barrington on Squash", published by Stanley Paul, 1973.

Khan, Nasrullah
Living people
Pashtun people
Year of birth missing (living people)
Khan family (squash)